Cone peppers, also known as biberi peppers, conic peppers, or conical peppers, are a group of chili peppers within the species Capsicum annuum.

Taxonomy
Cone peppers are sometimes considered a specific botanical variety, Capsicum annuum var. conoides. This variety is not an accepted name in the Global Biodiversity Information Facility, the Germplasm Resources Information Network, or Kew's Plants of the World Online and is considered a synonym of Capsicum annuum var. annuum.

This group is sometimes called the Capsicum annuum "conoides group" (or conioides group [sic]).

Cultivars
Cultivars include:
'Chao Tian Jiao'
'Pacete': small, pungent
'Super Chili'

References

Chili peppers
Crops originating from the Americas